Thermoanaerobacterium aotearoense is a slightly acidophilic, anaerobic, thermophile first isolated from hot springs in New Zealand, hence its name. It is Gram-negative, peritrichously flagellated, rod-shaped forming oval terminal endospores. Strain JW/SL-NZ613T (= DSM 10170) is its type strain. Its genome has been sequenced.

References

Further reading

External links
LPSN

Type strain of Thermoanaerobacterium aotearoense at BacDive -  the Bacterial Diversity Metadatabase

Thermoanaerobacterales
Thermophiles
Anaerobes
Bacteria described in 1996